Fransa-Pax Football Club (formerly known as Pax of Nagoa) was an Indian professional football club based in Nagoa, Goa. The club is best known for folding halfway through the 2005–06 Indian National Football League after their owner Mickky Pacheco accused the All India Football Federation of trying to relegate the club. They have also competed in the Goa Professional League.

History
Fransa Pax qualified for the 2004–05 Indian National Football League and finished in fifth place that season.

2005–06: final season
After finishing fifth in 2004–05, Fransa Pax were given the schedule for the 2005–06 Indian National Football League in which 7 of their final 8 games were away from home. The ownership group took this as a sign the All India Football Federation wanted them relegated. On 30 January 2006, Pax played a star-filled Mahindra United (who would also disband in 2008) who were then in first place and reigning Federation Cup champions. Mahindra won the match 2–1. After the match, Fransa coach Norbert Fernandes, along with goalkeeper Virendar Singh and Ivan D’Silva, manhandled the referee, Vikramjit Purakayastha, after he awarded Mahindra with two suspicious penalties which were both converted to help them win. Fransa owner Mickky Pacheco ran after the match commissioner Enayetullah around the Fatorda Stadium. Also around 2000 Fransa fans vandalized the Fatorda Stadium.

After the game, Pacheco threatened to fold his team if justice was not served for the match against Mahindra United even though under FIFA rule you can't change the result after the game is completed. On 3 February 2006 when Pax was to play Air India FC the players for Pax did not take to the field. Reason being that Pacheco said that if no justice is taken he would not field a team. Due to pressure from Zee Sports the AIFF canceled three games of Pax's. On 7 February 2006, the AIFF met to discuss the future of the league and club. They decided to reject Pacheco's claim and asked if he would let his team play. At first he said no but on 8 February 2006 he said yes. The AIFF then rejected all demands that the club had and that the players would be punished for the Mahindra United game incident. The AIFF then asked for a letter of apology in which Fransa said no and said they wanted a replay against Air India. The AIFF agreed and set the replay date. Air India then went against this and by FIFA rules were awarded the 3 points. On 23 March 2006, Pax was officially dissolved as a football club.

Honours
 National Football League II
Runners-up (1): 2003–04

See also
 Goans in football
 List of football clubs in India

References

 
Defunct football clubs in India
2006 disestablishments in India
Association football clubs disestablished in 2006
Organizations with year of establishment missing
Football clubs in Goa